Robert Hooke FRS (18 July 16353 March 1703) was an English polymath active as a scientist, natural philosopher and architect, who is credited to be one of the first two scientists to discover microorganisms in 1665 using a compound microscope that he built himself, the other scientist being Antoni van Leeuwenhoek in 1674. An impoverished scientific inquirer in young adulthood, he found wealth and esteem by performing over half of the architectural surveys after London's great fire of 1666. Hooke was also a member of the Royal Society and since 1662 was its curator of experiments. Hooke was also Professor of Geometry at Gresham College.

As an assistant to physical scientist Robert Boyle, Hooke built the vacuum pumps used in Boyle's experiments on gas law, and himself conducted experiments. In 1673, Hooke built the earliest Gregorian telescope, and then he observed the rotations of the planets Mars and Jupiter. Hooke's 1665 book Micrographia, in which he coined the term "cell", spurred microscopic investigations. Investigating in optics, specifically light refraction, he inferred a wave theory of light. And his is the first recorded hypothesis of heat expanding matter, air's composition by small particles at larger distances, and heat as energy.

In physics, he approximated experimental confirmation that gravity heeds an inverse square law, and first hypothesised such a relation in planetary motion, too, a principle furthered and formalised by Isaac Newton in Newton's law of universal gravitation. Priority over this insight contributed to the rivalry between Hooke and Newton, who thus antagonized Hooke's legacy. In geology and paleontology, Hooke originated the theory of a terraqueous globe, disputed the literally Biblical view of the Earth's age, hypothesised the extinction of species, and argued that fossils atop hills and mountains had become elevated by geological processes. Thus observing microscopic fossils, Hooke presaged the theory of biological evolution. Hooke's pioneering work in land surveying and in mapmaking aided development of the first modern plan-form map, although his grid-system plan for London was rejected in favour of rebuilding along existing routes.  Even so, Hooke was key in devising for London a set of planning controls that remain influential. In recent times, he has been called "England's Leonardo".

Life and works

Early life 
Much of what is known of Hooke's early life comes from an autobiography that he commenced in 1696 but never completed. Richard Waller mentions it in his introduction to The Posthumous Works of Robert Hooke, M.D. S.R.S., printed in 1705.  The work of Waller, along with John Ward's Lives of the Gresham Professors (with a list of his major works) and John Aubrey's Brief Lives, form the major near-contemporaneous biographical accounts of Hooke.

Robert Hooke was born in 1635 in Freshwater on the Isle of Wight to Cecily Gyles and John Hooke, an Anglican priest, the curate of Freshwater's Church of All Saints. Father John Hooke's two brothers, Robert's paternal uncles, were also ministers. A royalist, John Hooke likely was among a group that went to pay respects to Charles I as he escaped to the Isle of Wight. Expected to join the church, Robert, too, would become a staunch monarchist. Robert was the youngest, by seven years, of four siblings, two boys and two girls. Their father led a local school as well, yet at least partly homeschooled Robert, frail in health. The young Robert Hooke was fascinated by observation, mechanical works, and drawing. He dismantled a brass clock and built a wooden replica that reportedly worked "well enough". He made his own drawing materials from coal, chalk, and ruddle (iron ore).

On his father's death in 1648, Robert inherited 40 pounds. He took this to London with the aim of beginning an apprenticeship, and studied briefly with Samuel Cowper and Peter Lely, but was persuaded instead to enter Westminster School by its headmaster Dr. Richard Busby. Hooke quickly mastered Latin and Greek, mastered Euclid's Elements, learned to play the organ, and began his lifelong study of mechanics.

Oxford 

In 1653, Hooke (who had also undertaken a course of twenty lessons on the organ) secured a chorister's place at Christ Church, Oxford. He was employed as a "chemical assistant" to Dr Thomas Willis, for whom Hooke developed a great admiration.  There he met the natural philosopher Robert Boyle, and gained employment as his assistant from about 1655 to 1662, constructing, operating, and demonstrating Boyle's "machina Boyleana" or air pump. In 1659, Hooke described some elements of a method of heavier-than-air flight to Wilkins, but concluded that human muscles were insufficient to the task. In 1662, he was awarded a Master of Arts degree.

Hooke himself characterised his Oxford days as the foundation of his lifelong passion for science, and the friends he made there were of paramount importance to him throughout his career, particularly Christopher Wren.  Wadham was then under the guidance of John Wilkins, who had a profound impact on Hooke and those around him. There was a sense of urgency in preserving the scientific work which they perceived as being threatened by The Protectorate.  Wilkins' "philosophical meetings" in his study were clearly important, though few records survive except for the experiments Boyle conducted in 1658 and published in 1660.  This group went on to form the nucleus of the Royal Society.  Hooke developed an air pump for Boyle's experiments based on the pump of Ralph Greatorex, which was considered, in Hooke's words, "too gross to perform any great matter." It is known that Hooke had a particularly keen eye, and was an adept mathematician, neither of which applied to Boyle.  It has been suggested that Hooke probably made the observations and may well have developed the mathematics of Boyle's law.  Regardless, it is clear that Hooke was a valued assistant to Boyle and the two retained a mutual high regard.

A chance surviving copy of Willis's pioneering , a gift from the author, was chosen by Hooke from Wilkins' library on his death as a memento at John Tillotson's invitation.  This book is now in the Wellcome Library.  The book and its inscription in Hooke's hand are a testament to the lasting influence of Wilkins and his circle on the young Hooke.

Royal Society 
The Royal Society was founded in 1660, and in April 1661 the society debated a short tract on the rising of water in slender glass pipes, in which Hooke reported that the height water rose was related to the bore of the pipe (due to what is now termed capillary action).  His explanation of this phenomenon was subsequently published in Micrography Observ. issue 6, in which he also explored the nature of "the fluidity of gravity". On 5 November 1661, Sir Robert Moray proposed that a Curator be appointed to furnish the society with Experiments, and this was unanimously passed with Hooke being named.  His appointment was made on 12 November, with thanks recorded to Dr. Boyle for releasing him to the Society's employment.

In 1664, Sir John Cutler settled an annual gratuity of fifty pounds on the Society for the founding of a Mechanick Lecture, and the Fellows appointed Hooke to this task.  On 27 June 1664 he was confirmed to the office, and on 11 January 1665 was named Curator by Office for life with an additional salary of £30 to Cutler's annuity.

Hooke's role at the Royal Society was to demonstrate experiments from his own methods or at the suggestion of members. Among his earliest demonstrations were discussions of the nature of air, the implosion of glass bubbles which had been sealed with comprehensive hot air, and demonstrating that the Pabulum vitae and flammae were one and the same. He also demonstrated that a dog could be kept alive with its thorax opened, provided air was pumped in and out of its lungs, and noting the difference between venous and arterial blood.

Instruments were devised to measure a second of arc in the movement of the sun or other stars, to measure the strength of gunpowder, and in particular an engine to cut teeth for watches, much finer than could be managed by hand, an invention which was, by Hooke's death, in constant use.

In 1663 and 1664, Hooke made his microscopic observations, subsequently collated in Micrographia in 1665.

On 20 March 1664, Hooke succeeded Arthur Dacres as Gresham Professor of Geometry.  Hooke received the degree of "Doctor of Physic" in December 1691.

Hooke and Newcomen 
There is a widely reported but seemingly incorrect story that Dr Hooke corresponded with Thomas Newcomen in connection with Newcomen's invention of the steam engine. This story was discussed by Rhys Jenkins, a past President of the Newcomen Society, in 1936. Jenkins traced the origin of the story to an article "Steam Engines" by Dr. John Robison (1739–1805) in the third edition of the "Encyclopædia Britannica”, which says There are to be found among Hooke's papers, in the possession of the Royal Society, some notes of observations, for the use of Newcomen, his countryman, on Papin's boasted method of transmitting to a great distance the action of an mill by means of pipes, and that Hooke had dissuaded Newcomen from erecting a machine on this principle. Jenkins points out a number of errors in Robison's article, and questions whether the correspondent might in fact have been Newton, whom Hooke is known to have corresponded with, the name being misread as Newcomen. A search by Mr. H W Dickinson of Hooke's papers held by the Royal Society, which had been bound together in the middle of the 18th century, i.e. before Robison's time, and carefully preserved since, revealed no trace of any correspondence between Hooke and Newcomen. Jenkins concluded ... this story must be omitted from the history of the steam engine, at any rate until documentary evidence is forthcoming.

In the intervening years since 1936 no such evidence has been found, but the story persists. For instance, in a book published in 2011 it is said that in a letter dated 1703 Hooke did suggest that Newcomen use condensing steam to drive the piston.

Personality and disputes 
Reputedly, Hooke was a staunch friend and ally. In his early training at Wadham College, he was among ardent royalists, particularly Christopher Wren. Yet allegedly, Hooke was also proud, and often annoyed by intellectual competitors. Hooke contended that Oldenburg had leaked details of Hooke's watch escapement. Otherwise, Hooke guarded his own ideas and used ciphers.

On the other hand, as the Royal Society's curator of experiments, Hooke was tasked to demonstrate many ideas sent in to the Society. Some evidence suggests that Hooke subsequently assumed credit for some of these ideas. Yet in this period of immense scientific progress, numerous ideas were developed in multiple places roughly simultaneously. Immensely busy, Hook let many of his own ideas remain undeveloped, although others he patented.

Perhaps more significantly, Hooke and Isaac Newton disputed over credit for certain breakthroughs in physical science, including gravitation, astronomy, and optics. After Hooke's death, Newton questioned his legacy. And as the Royal Society's president, Newton allegedly destroyed or failed to preserve the only known portrait of Hooke. In the 20th century, researchers Robert Gunther and Margaret  revived Hooke's legacy, establishing Hooke among the most influential scientists of his time.

None of this should distract from Hooke's inventiveness, his remarkable experimental facility, and his capacity for hard work. His ideas about gravitation, and his claim of priority for the inverse square law, are outlined below.  He was granted a large number of patents for inventions and refinements in the fields of elasticity, optics, and barometry. The Royal Society's Hooke papers, rediscovered in 2006, (after disappearing when Newton took over) may open up a modern reassessment.

Much has been written about the unpleasant side of Hooke's personality, starting with comments by his first biographer, Richard Waller, that Hooke was "in person, but despicable" and "melancholy, mistrustful, and jealous." Waller's comments influenced other writers for well over two centuries, so that a picture of Hooke as a disgruntled, selfish, anti-social curmudgeon dominates many older books and articles.  For example, Arthur Berry said that Hooke "claimed credit for most of the scientific discoveries of the time." Sullivan wrote that Hooke was "positively unscrupulous" and possessing an "uneasy apprehensive vanity" in dealings with Newton. Manuel used the phrase "cantankerous, envious, vengeful" in his description. More described Hooke having both a "cynical temperament" and a "caustic tongue." Andrade was more sympathetic, but still used the adjectives "difficult", "suspicious", and "irritable" in describing Hooke.

The publication of Hooke's diary in 1935 revealed previously unknown details about his social and familial relationships. Biographer Margaret  argued that "the picture which is usually painted of Hooke as a morose... recluse is completely false." Hooke interacted with noted craftsmen such as Thomas Tompion, the clockmaker, and Christopher Cocks (Cox), an instrument maker.  He often met Christopher Wren, with whom he shared many interests, and had a lasting friendship with John Aubrey.  Hooke's diaries also make frequent reference to meetings at coffeehouses and taverns, and to dinners with Robert Boyle.  He took tea on many occasions with his lab assistant, Harry Hunt. Although Hooke largely lived alone, apart from the servants who ran his home, his niece Grace Hooke and cousin Tom Giles lived with him for some years as children.

Hooke never married. His diary records that he sexually abused his niece Grace, who was in his custody between the ages of 10 and 17, during her teens. Hooke also had sexual relations with several maids and housekeepers, and records that one of these housekeepers gave birth to a girl, but he does not note the child's paternity.

Under the strain of an enormous workload, Hooke suffered from headaches, dizziness and bouts of insomnia. Approaching these in the same scientific spirit that he brought to his work, he experimented with self-medication, diligently recording symptoms, substances and effects in his diary. He regularly used sal ammoniac, purges and opiates, which appear to have had an increasing impact on his physical and mental health over time.

On 3 March 1703 Hooke died in London, having been blind and bedridden during the last year of his life. A chest containing £8,000 in money and gold was found in his room at Gresham College. Although he had talked of leaving a generous bequest to the Royal Society, which would have given his name to a library, laboratory and lectures, no will was found and the money passed to a cousin, Elizabeth Stephens.  Hooke was buried at St Helen's Bishopsgate, but the precise location of his grave is unknown.

Science

Mechanics 
In 1660, Hooke discovered the law of elasticity which bears his name and which describes the linear variation of tension with extension in an elastic spring.  He first described this discovery in the anagram "ceiiinosssttuv", whose solution he published in 1678 as "Ut tensio, sic vis" meaning "As the extension, so the force."  Hooke's work on elasticity culminated, for practical purposes, in his development of the balance spring or hairspring, which for the first time enabled a portable timepiece – a watch – to keep time with reasonable accuracy.  A bitter dispute between Hooke and Christiaan Huygens on the priority of this invention was to continue for centuries after the death of both; but a note dated 23 June 1670 in the Hooke Folio (see External links below), describing a demonstration of a balance-controlled watch before the Royal Society, has been held to favour Hooke's claim.

Hooke first announced his law of elasticity as an anagram.  This was a method sometimes used by scientists, such as Hooke, Huygens, Galileo, and others, to establish priority for a discovery without revealing details.

Hooke became Curator of Experiments in 1662 to the newly founded Royal Society, and took responsibility for experiments performed at its weekly meetings.  This was a position he held for over 40 years.  While this position kept him in the thick of science in Britain and beyond, it also led to some heated arguments with other scientists, such as Huygens (see above) and particularly with Isaac Newton and the Royal Society's Henry Oldenburg.  In 1664 Hooke also was appointed Professor of Geometry at Gresham College in London and Cutlerian Lecturer in Mechanics.

On 8 July 1680, Hooke observed the nodal patterns associated with the modes of vibration of glass plates. He ran a bow along the edge of a glass plate covered with flour, and saw the nodal patterns emerge. In acoustics, in 1681 he showed the Royal Society that musical tones could be generated from spinning brass cogs cut with teeth in particular proportions.

Gravitation 
While many of his contemporaries believed in the aether as a medium for transmitting attraction or repulsion between separated celestial bodies, Hooke argued for an attracting principle of gravitation in Micrographia (1665). Hooke's 1666 Royal Society lecture on gravity added two further principles: that all bodies move in straight lines until deflected by some force and that the attractive force is stronger for closer bodies.  Dugald Stewart quoted Hooke's own words on his system of the world. "I will explain," says Hooke, in a communication to the Royal Society in 1666, "a system of the world very different from any yet received. It is founded on the following positions. 1. That all the heavenly bodies have not only a gravitation of their parts to their own proper centre, but that they also mutually attract each other within their spheres of action. 2. That all bodies having a simple motion, will continue to move in a straight line, unless continually deflected from it by some extraneous force, causing them to describe a circle, an ellipse, or some other curve. 3. That this attraction is so much the greater as the bodies are nearer. As to the proportion in which those forces diminish by an increase of distance, I own I have not discovered it...."

Hooke's 1670 Gresham lecture explained that gravitation applied to "all celestial bodies" and added the principles that the gravitating power decreases with distance and that in the absence of any such power bodies move in straight lines.

Hooke published his ideas about the "System of the World" again in somewhat developed form in 1674, as an addition to "An Attempt to Prove the Motion of the Earth from Observations". Hooke clearly postulated mutual attractions between the Sun and planets, in a way that increased with nearness to the attracting body.

Hooke's statements up to 1674 made no mention, however, that an inverse square law applies or might apply to these attractions.  Hooke's gravitation was also not yet universal, though it approached universality more closely than previous hypotheses. Hooke also did not provide accompanying evidence or mathematical demonstration.  On these two aspects, Hooke stated in 1674: "Now what these several degrees [of gravitational attraction] are I have not yet experimentally verified" (indicating that he did not yet know what law the gravitation might follow); and as to his whole proposal: "This I only hint at present", "having my self many other things in hand which I would first compleat, and therefore cannot so well attend it" (i.e. "prosecuting this Inquiry").

In November 1679, Hooke initiated a remarkable exchange of letters with Newton (of which the full text is now published). Hooke's ostensible purpose was to tell Newton that Hooke had been appointed to manage the Royal Society's correspondence. Hooke therefore wanted to hear from members about their researches, or their views about the researches of others; and as if to whet Newton's interest, he asked what Newton thought about various matters, giving a whole list, mentioning "compounding the celestial motions of the planetts of a direct motion by the tangent and an attractive motion towards the central body", and "my hypothesis of the lawes or causes of springinesse", and then a new hypothesis from Paris about planetary motions (which Hooke described at length), and then efforts to carry out or improve national surveys, the difference of latitude between London and Cambridge, and other items.   Newton's reply offered "a fansy of my own" about a terrestrial experiment (not a proposal about celestial motions) which might detect the Earth's motion, by the use of a body first suspended in air and then dropped to let it fall.  The main point was to indicate how Newton thought the falling body could experimentally reveal the Earth's motion by its direction of deviation from the vertical, but he went on hypothetically to consider how its motion could continue if the solid Earth had not been in the way (on a spiral path to the centre). Hooke disagreed with Newton's idea of how the body would continue to move. A short further correspondence developed, and towards the end of it Hooke, writing on 6 January 1679|80 to Newton, communicated his "supposition ... that the Attraction always is in a duplicate proportion to the Distance from the Center Reciprocall, and Consequently that the Velocity will be in a subduplicate proportion to the Attraction and Consequently as Kepler Supposes Reciprocall to the Distance." (Hooke's inference about the velocity was actually incorrect)

In 1686, when the first book of Newton's Principia was presented to the Royal Society, Hooke claimed that he had given Newton the "notion" of "the rule of the decrease of Gravity, being reciprocally as the squares of the distances from the Center".  At the same time (according to Edmond Halley's contemporary report) Hooke agreed that "the Demonstration of the Curves generated therby" was wholly Newton's.

A recent assessment about the early history of the inverse square law is that "by the late 1660s," the assumption of an "inverse proportion between gravity and the square of distance was rather common and had been advanced by a number of different people for different reasons". Newton himself had shown in the 1660s that for planetary motion under a circular assumption, force in the radial direction had an inverse-square relation with distance from the center. Newton, faced in May 1686 with Hooke's claim on the inverse square law, denied that Hooke was to be credited as author of the idea, giving reasons including the citation of prior work by others before Hooke. Newton also firmly claimed that even if it had happened that he had first heard of the inverse square proportion from Hooke, which it had not, he would still have some rights to it in view of his mathematical developments and demonstrations, which enabled observations to be relied on as evidence of its accuracy, while Hooke, without mathematical demonstrations and evidence in favour of the supposition, could only guess (according to Newton) that it was approximately valid "at great distances from the center".

On the other hand, Newton did accept and acknowledge, in all editions of the Principia, that Hooke (but not exclusively Hooke) had separately appreciated the inverse square law in the solar system.  Newton acknowledged Wren, Hooke and Halley in this connection in the Scholium to Proposition 4 in Book 1. Newton also acknowledged to Halley that his correspondence with Hooke in 1679–80 had reawakened his dormant interest in astronomical matters, but that did not mean, according to Newton, that Hooke had told Newton anything new or original: "yet am I not beholden to him for any light into that business but only for the diversion he gave me from my other studies to think on these things & for his dogmaticalness in writing as if he had found the motion in the Ellipsis, which inclined me to try it."

One of the contrasts between the two men was that Newton was primarily a pioneer in mathematical analysis and its applications as well as optical experimentation, while Hooke was a creative experimenter of such great range, that it is not surprising to find that he left some of his ideas, such as those about gravitation, undeveloped.  This in turn makes it understandable how in 1759, decades after the deaths of both Newton and Hooke, Alexis Clairaut, mathematical astronomer eminent in his own right in the field of gravitational studies, made his assessment after reviewing what Hooke had published on gravitation.  "One must not think that this idea ... of Hooke diminishes Newton's glory", Clairaut wrote; "The example of Hooke" serves "to show what a distance there is between a truth that is glimpsed and a truth that is demonstrated".

Horology 
Hooke made tremendously important contributions to the science of timekeeping, being intimately involved in the advances of his time; the introduction of the pendulum as a better regulator for clocks, the balance spring to improve the timekeeping of watches, and the proposal that a precise timekeeper could be used to find the longitude at sea.

Anchor escapement 

In 1655, according to his autobiographical notes, Hooke began to acquaint himself with astronomy, through the good offices of John Ward.  Hooke applied himself to the improvement of the pendulum and in 1657 or 1658, he began to improve on pendulum mechanisms, studying the work of Giovanni Riccioli, and going on to study both gravitation and the mechanics of timekeeping.

Henry Sully, writing in Paris in 1717, described the anchor escapement as an admirable invention of which Dr. Hooke, formerly professor of geometry in Gresham College at London, was the inventor. William Derham also attributes it to Hooke.

Watch balance spring 

Hooke recorded that he conceived of a way to determine longitude (then a critical problem for navigation), and with the help of Boyle and others he attempted to patent it.  In the process, Hooke demonstrated a pocket-watch of his own devising, fitted with a coil spring attached to the arbour of the balance.  Hooke's ultimate failure to secure sufficiently lucrative terms for the exploitation of this idea resulted in its being shelved, and evidently caused him to become more jealous of his inventions.

Hooke developed the balance spring independently of and at least 5 years before Christiaan Huygens, who published his own work in Journal de Scavans in February 1675.

Microscopy 

Hooke's 1665 book Micrographia, describing observations with microscopes and telescopes, as well as original work in biology, contains the earliest of an observed microorganism, a microfungus Mucor. Hooke coined the term cell, suggesting plant structure's resemblance to honeycomb cells.  The hand-crafted, leather and gold-tooled microscope he used to make the observations for Micrographia, originally constructed by Christopher White in London, is on display at the National Museum of Health and Medicine in Maryland.

Micrographia also contains Hooke's, or perhaps Boyle and Hooke's, ideas on combustion.  Hooke's experiments led him to conclude that combustion involves a substance that is mixed with air, a statement with which modern scientists would agree, but that was not understood widely, if at all, in the seventeenth century.  Hooke went on to conclude that respiration also involves a specific component of the air. Partington even goes so far as to claim that if "Hooke had continued his experiments on combustion it is probable that he would have discovered oxygen".

Palaeontology 

One of the observations in Micrographia was of fossil wood, the microscopic structure of which he compared to ordinary wood. This led him to conclude that fossilised objects like petrified wood and fossil shells, such as Ammonites, were the remains of living things that had been soaked in petrifying water laden with minerals. Hooke believed that such fossils provided reliable clues to the past history of life on Earth, and, despite the objections of contemporary naturalists like John Ray who found the concept of extinction theologically unacceptable, that in some cases they might represent species that had become extinct through some geological disaster.

Charles Lyell wrote the following in his Principles of Geology (1832).

'The Posthumous Works of Robert Hooke M.D.,'... appeared in 1705, containing 'A Discourse of Earthquakes'... His treatise... is the most philosophical production of that age, in regard to the causes of former changes in the organic and inorganic kingdoms of nature. 'However trivial a thing,' he says, 'a rotten shell may appear to some, yet these monuments of nature are more certain tokens of antiquity than coins or medals, since the best of those may be counterfeited or made by art and design, as may also books, manuscripts, and inscriptions, as all the learned are now sufficiently satisfied has often been actually practised,' &c.; 'and though it must be granted that it is very difficult to read them and to raise a chronology out of them, and to state the intervals of the time wherein such or such catastrophes and mutations have happened, yet it is not impossible.

Astronomy 

One of the more-challenging problems tackled by Hooke was the measurement of the distance to a star (other than the Sun).  The star chosen was Gamma Draconis and the method to be used was parallax determination.  After several months of observing, in 1669, Hooke believed that the desired result had been achieved.  It is now known that Hooke's equipment was far too imprecise to allow the measurement to succeed. Gamma Draconis was the same star James Bradley used in 1725 in discovering the aberration of light.

Hooke's activities in astronomy extended beyond the study of stellar distance.  His Micrographia contains illustrations of the Pleiades star cluster as well as of lunar craters.  He performed experiments to study how such craters might have formed. Hooke also was an early observer of the rings of Saturn, and discovered one of the first observed double-star systems, Gamma Arietis, in 1664.

Memory 
A lesser-known contribution, however one of the first of its kind, was Hooke's scientific model of human memory.  Hooke in a 1682 lecture to the Royal Society proposed a mechanistic model of human memory, which would bear little resemblance to the mainly philosophical models before it. This model addressed the components of encoding, memory capacity, repetition, retrieval, and forgetting –  some with surprising modern accuracy. This work, overlooked for nearly 200 years, shared a variety of similarities with Richard Semon's work of 1919/1923, both assuming memories were physical and located in the brain. The model's more interesting points are that it (1) allows for attention and other top-down influences on encoding; (2) it uses resonance to implement parallel, cue-dependent retrieval; (3) it explains memory for recency; (4) it offers a single-system account of repetition and priming, and (5) the power law of forgetting can be derived from the model's assumption in a straightforward way. This lecture would be published posthumously in 1705 as the memory model was unusually placed in a series of works on the nature of light.  It has been speculated that this work saw little review as the printing was done in small batches in a post-Newtonian age of science and was most likely deemed out of date by the time it was published.  Further interfering with its success was contemporary memory psychologists' rejection of immaterial souls, which Hooke invoked to some degree in regards to the processes of attention, encoding and retrieval.

Architecture 

Hooke was Surveyor to the City of London and chief assistant to Christopher Wren, in which capacity he helped Wren rebuild London after the Great Fire in 1666, and also worked on the design of London's Monument to the fire, the Royal Greenwich Observatory, Montagu House in Bloomsbury, and the Bethlem Royal Hospital (which became known as 'Bedlam').  Other buildings designed by Hooke include The Royal College of Physicians (1679), Ragley Hall in Warwickshire, Ramsbury Manor in Wiltshire and the parish church of St Mary Magdalene at Willen in Milton Keynes, Buckinghamshire.  Hooke's collaboration with Christopher Wren also included St Paul's Cathedral, whose dome uses a method of construction conceived by Hooke. Hooke also participated in the design of the Pepys Library, which held the manuscripts of Samuel Pepys' diaries, the most frequently cited eyewitness account of the Great Fire of London.

Hooke and Wren both being keen astronomers, the Monument was designed to serve a scientific function as a telescope for observing transits, though Hooke's characteristically precise measurements after completion showed that the movement of the column in the wind made it unusable for this purpose. The legacy of this can be observed in the construction of the spiral staircase, which has no central column, and in the observation chamber which remains in place below ground level.

In the reconstruction after the Great Fire, Hooke proposed redesigning London's streets on a grid pattern with wide boulevards and arteries, a pattern subsequently used in Haussmann's renovation of Paris, in Liverpool, and in many American cities.  This proposal was thwarted by arguments over property rights, as property owners were surreptitiously shifting their boundaries.  Hooke was in demand to settle many of these disputes, due to his competence as a surveyor and his tact as an arbitrator.

Likenesses 

No authenticated portrait of Robert Hooke exists. This situation has sometimes been attributed to the heated conflicts between Hooke and Newton, although Hooke's biographer Allan Chapman rejects as a myth the claims that Newton or his acolytes deliberately destroyed Hooke's portrait. German antiquarian and scholar Zacharias Conrad von Uffenbach visited the Royal Society in 1710 and his account of his visit specifically mentions him being shown the portraits of 'Boyle and Hoock' (which were said to be good likenesses), but while Boyle's portrait survives, Hooke's has evidently been lost.  In Hooke's time, the Royal Society met at Gresham College, but within a few months of Hooke's death Newton became the Society's president and plans were laid for a new meeting place.  When the move to new quarters finally was made a few years later, in 1710, Hooke's Royal Society portrait went missing, and has yet to be found.

Two contemporary written descriptions of Hooke's appearance have survived. The first was recorded by his close friend John Aubrey, who described Hooke in middle age and at the height of his creative powers:

The second is a rather unflattering description of Hooke as an old man, written by Richard Waller:

Time magazine published a portrait, supposedly of Hooke, on 3 July 1939.  However, when the source was traced by Ashley Montagu, it was found to lack a verifiable connection to Hooke.  Moreover, Montagu found that two contemporary written descriptions of Hooke's appearance agreed with one another, but that neither matched the Time'''s portrait.

In 2003, historian Lisa Jardine claimed that a recently discovered portrait was of Hooke, but this claim was disproved by William B. Jensen of the University of Cincinnati. The portrait identified by Jardine depicts the Flemish scholar Jan Baptist van Helmont.

Other possible likenesses of Hooke include the following:
 A seal used by Hooke displays an unusual profile portrait of a man's head, which some have argued portrays Hooke.
 The engraved frontispiece to the 1728 edition of Chambers' Cyclopedia shows a drawing of a bust of Robert Hooke. The extent to which the drawing is based on an actual work of art is unknown.
 A memorial window existed at St Helen's Bishopsgate in London, but it was a formulaic rendering, not a likeness.  The window was destroyed in the 1993 Bishopsgate bombing.

In 2003, amateur history painter Rita Greer embarked on a self-funded project to memorialise Hooke. Her project aimed to produce credible images of him, both painted and drawn, that she believes fit the descriptions of him by his contemporaries John Aubrey and Richard Waller. Greer's images of Hooke, his life and work have been used for TV programmes in UK and US, in books, magazines and for PR.

In 2019, Dr. Larry Griffing, an associate professor at Texas A&M University, conjectured that a contemporary portrait by famed painter Mary Beale of an unknown sitter and referred to as "Portrait of a Mathematician" was actually Hooke, noting that the physical features of the sitter in the portrait match his. The figure points to a drawing of elliptical motion which appears to match an unpublished manuscript created by Hooke. The painting also includes an orrery depicting the same principle. Griffing believes that buildings included in the image are of Lowther Castle, now in Cumbria, and pointedly its Church of St Michael. The church was renovated under one of Hooke's architectural commissions, which Beale would have gained familiarity with when commissioned by the Lowther family. Griffing theorizes that the painting would once have been owned by the Royal Society, but was purposefully abandoned when Newton as its president moved the Society's official residence in 1710.

 Commemorations 

 3514 Hooke, an asteroid (1971 UJ)
 Craters on the Moon and on Mars are named in his honour.
 The Hooke Medal
 Robert Hooke Science Centre, Westminster School, London
 List of new memorials to Robert Hooke 2005–2009
 The Boyle-Hooke plaque in Oxford

 Works 
 
 Lectures de potentia restitutiva, or, Of spring explaining the power of springing bodies. London : Printed for John Martyn. 1678.
 
 Micrographia 
  includes An Attempt to prove the Annual Motion of the Earth, Animadversions on the Machina Coelestis of Mr. Hevelius, A Description of Helioscopes with other instruments, Mechanical Improvement of Lamps, Remarks about Comets 1677, Microscopium, Lectures on the Spring, etc.
 
 

 See also 

 
 
 
 
 
 
 
 
 
 
 List of astronomical instrument makers

 Notes 

 References 

 Sources and Further reading

 
 
 
 
 
 
 
Robert Gunther's Early Science in Oxford, a history of science in Oxford during the Protectorate, Restoration and Age of Enlightenment, devotes five of its fourteen volumes to Hooke.
 
 
 
 
 (Published in the US as The Forgotten Genius)
 
 

 External links 

 Robert Hooke, hosted by Westminster School
 
 
 
 
 Micrographia''
 Hooke's Micrographia, at Project Gutenberg (downloadable collections, including searchable ASCII text and book as complete html document with images)
 Hooke's  Micrographia, at Linda Hall Library
 Digitzed images of Micrographia housed at the University of Kentucky Libraries Special Collections Research Center
 Lost manuscript of Robert Hooke discovered – from The Guardian
 Manuscript bought for The Royal Society – from The Guardian
 Robert Hooke's Books, a searchable database of books that belonged to or were annotated by Robert Hooke
 
  – A 60-minute presentation by Prof. Michael Cooper, Gresham College, with links to slides, audio, video, and a transcript, with references
 The posthumous works of Robert Hooke (1705) – full digital facsimile from Linda Hall Library

Alumni of Wadham College, Oxford
English Anglicans
17th-century English architects
17th-century English scientists
English inventors
English physicists
Natural philosophers
Original Fellows of the Royal Society
People educated at Westminster School, London
People from Freshwater, Isle of Wight
Professors of Gresham College
English Christians
British scientific instrument makers
Age of Enlightenment
1635 births
1703 deaths
Architects from the Isle of Wight